The modifier letter prime (ʹ) is a spacing glyph. It is used in the romanization of Cyrillic for palatalized consonants (particularly for the letter ь) and in the orthography of the Skolt Sami for suprasegmental palatalization.

See also
 single apostrophe .
 single vertical line .
 Similar symbol 

Punctuation